Kadidal Manjappa Ministry was the Council of Ministers in Mysore, a state in South India headed by Kadidal Manjappa of the Indian National Congress.

The ministry had multiple  ministers including the Chief Minister of Mysore. All ministers belonged to the Indian National Congress.

Kadidal Manjappa became Chief Minister of Mysore after resignation of Kengal Hanumanthaiah. Manjappa resigned as Chief Minister of Mysore following Unification of Karnataka.

Chief Minister & Cabinet Ministers

Minister of State

See also 
 Mysore Legislative Assembly
 Mysore Legislative Council
 Politics of Mysore

References 

Cabinets established in 1956
1956 establishments in Mysore State
1956 in Indian politics
1956 disestablishments in India
Manjappa
Indian National Congress state ministries
Cabinets disestablished in 1956